Robert Drew (1924–2014) was an American filmmaker.

Robert Drew may also refer to:
 Robert Drew (politician) (1575–1645), English politician
 Robert Drew Associates

See also
 Robert Drewe (born 1943), Australian writer
 Robert Drew Hicks (1850–1929), British scholar
 Robert Drews (born 1936), American historian